A bukkehorn (Norwegian) or bockhorn (Swedish), also called ″Billy Goat Horn″ in English, is an ancient Scandinavian musical instrument, made from the horn of a  ram or a goat. The horn is usually made from a goat horn harvested 5 to 7 years before the instrument is crafted.  It was traditionally used by shepherds and milkmaids on summer dairy farms in the mountains, as a signal-instrument or as a scaring instrument. It is most commonly played by buzzing one's lips against the mouthpiece, but versions with a single reed similar to that of a clarinet also exist.

See also
 Music of Norway
 Music of Sweden

External links
 Karl Seglem plays the bukkehorn: https://web.archive.org/web/20150411044854/http://www.karlseglem.no/appbox/modules/cutecms/?key=biography&lg=en_en
  plays the bukkehorn in Disney's Frozen: https://web.archive.org/web/20131113212448/http://gullord.no/index.php/en/my-work

Norwegian musical instruments